Tora or TORA may refer to:

People
 Tora (given name), female given name
 Tora (surname)
 Tora people of Arabia and northern Africa
 Torá language, an extinct language once spoken in Brazil

Places

 Tora, Benin, in Borgou Department
 Tora, Burkina Faso, a village
 Torà, Catalonia, Spain, a town and municipality
 Tora (river), Tuscany, Italy
 Tora, Egypt, an ancient Egyptian quarry and modern town
 Tura Prison

Entertainment
 Tora (film), an Assamese children's film
 Tora San, the main character in the Japanese film series Otoko wa Tsurai yo
 Tora, a character from the anime film Dragon Ball Z: Bardock – The Father of Goku
 Tora, a main character in the manga Ushio and Tora
 Ice, also known as Tora Olafsdotter, a DC Comics superheroine
 Tora, a character in the NES version of Teenage Mutant Ninja Turtles
 Tora, a main character in Xenoblade Chronicles 2

Music
 Tora (band), an Australian electronic group
 Tora (Anna Vissi album), a 1988 album by Greek singer Anna Vissi
 Tora (Chrispa album), a 2003 album by Greek singer Chrispa
 "Tora", a 2012 single by Greek singer Sakis Rouvas

Computing
 Temporally-ordered routing algorithm, for routing data across wireless mesh network or mobile ad hoc networks
 TOra, a database administration and development tool

Other uses
 Tora (moth), a genus of moths
 Runway#TORA (takeoff run available), the length of runway declared available and suitable for the ground run of an airplane taking off
 Battle of Torà (1003), a victory of an alliance of Catalan counts over the Caliphate of Córdoba
 Cyclone Oratia, called Tora in Norway, a 2000 European windstorm

See also

Tola (disambiguation)
 Tora Tora Tora (disambiguation)
 Tora Tora, a hard rock band formed in 1985
 "Tora! Tora!", a song by rock band Van Halen from their 1980 album Women and Children First
 Torah, the Five Books of Moses
Tova (disambiguation)